Joe Parker is a South African stand-up comedian and promoter.

Joe Parker is responsible for the long running comedy show Joe Parker's Comedy Express, as well as the Improv Express devoted to improvisational theatre.

In 2008, Joe Parker opened Parker's Comedy and Jive, a dedicated venue for stand-up comedy in Johannesburg, South Africa.

See also
 List of stand-up comedians

References

External links 

 Parker's Comedy and Jive Website
 Parker Leisure promoter website
 Joe Parker's Comedy Express
 

South African male comedians
Living people
Year of birth missing (living people)